George Mallory Pynchon, Sr.  (November 16, 1862 – March 9, 1940) was the winner of the 1909 King's Cup and the 1912 New York Yacht Club's Glen Cove Cup with his yacht Istalena.

References

1862 births
1940 deaths
American male sailors (sport)